Ian Kamau is a Canadian writer, hip hop and spoken word artist, writer, designer, and visual artist from Nairobi, Kenya. Kamau is the son of Trinidadian Canadian artists and filmmakers Claire Prieto and Roger McTair.

Discography

Singles
  An Ocean Between Us (2016)
  You, I (2014)

Albums
 Selected tracks from September 9 Vol. 1 & 2 (Mixtape) (2009)
  Vol. 3 Love and Other Struggles (Mixtape) (2010)
 One Day Soon (2011)

EPs
  Cocoons (2011)
 First (2003)

Collaborations
Ian Kamau has been featured on the following tracks:

References

21st-century Canadian rappers
Canadian male rappers
Black Canadian musicians
Musicians from Nairobi
Living people
Underground rappers
Year of birth missing (living people)
21st-century Canadian male musicians